Kahkaran (also Romanized as Kahkarān; also known as Kahkarūn) is a village in Shesh Pir Rural District, Hamaijan District, Sepidan County, Fars Province, Iran. At the 2006 census, its population was 445, in 97 families.

References 

Populated places in Sepidan County